The Forest (Thai title: ป่า) is a 2016 Thai supernatural horror film written, directed, shot and edited by English flimmaker Paul Spurrier, with the help of his wife Jiriya, and starring two first-time child actors and Asanee Suwan. The screenplay in its original language form was translated by one Preeyaporn Chareonbutra, who had done likewise with Spurrier's previous Thai film production, P.

The story follows a former monk who has joined the teaching profession and is recently assigned by the education ministry to work at a grade school in a small village of an Isaan rural area, and it also follows one of his students, a bullied girl who encounters a mysterious wild boy in the woods neighboring the village, but this boy is merely wild in the sense of how he lives alone in the forest, subsisting bereft of clothing, tools and shelter, as he otherwise is ever articulate and well kept, like the human embodiment of an idea. The schoolgirl is unable to vocally communicate with anybody except for the forest boy. Her inability to speak has been the subject of ridicule and abuse by her classmates.

Cast
 Wannasa Wintawong as Ja, the bullied schoolgirl
 Tanapol Kamkunkam as the boy of the forest
 Asanee Suwan as Preecha, the new teacher
 Pongsanart Vinsiri as the headmaster
 Thidarat Kongkaew as Nittaya, the heralding teacher
 Vithaya Pansringarm as the village headman
 Schoolchildren:
 Natpatson Lhakkum as Waan
 Papada Chompurat as Tairn
 Jantimaporn Punkok as Bim
 Pawina Netta as Pim
 Ramphai Wintawong as Ja's father
 Kan-ha Khamkhunkham as the first poacher
 Tanapol Kamkunkam as the second poacher
 Nirut Romyen as the scary villager

Production
To choose the filming location, Paul Spurrier drove  in Isan, and eventually settled on a school in the city of Udon Thani. He cast the film by auditioning residents, including schoolchildren, from the area.

References

External links
 
 

2016 films
Thai supernatural horror films
Thai-language films
Films about magic